The Muppet Show: Music, Mayhem, and More is a Muppets soundtrack/compilation album released in 2002 by Rhino and Jim Henson Home Entertainment. Its release commemorates the 25th anniversary of The Muppet Show. Although the disc is considered a Muppet Show and Muppets soundtrack collection, it includes two tracks that originated on Sesame Street ("Mahna Mahna" and "Bein' Green").

This was the last Muppet album produced before The Walt Disney Company's acquisition of the Muppets in 2004; since then Muppet albums have been released by Walt Disney Records.

Track listing

Reception
Allmusic found that the mix of Muppet Show and Muppet movie music to be off-putting, saying, "Many listeners may find that the paltry amount of material from The Muppet Show merely whets their appetite for more. The soundtracks (apart from The Muppet Movie) don't pack the same combination of energy, laughs, and pathos that the TV show did; they try too hard to be statements or big emotional moments and lack the effortless grace of The Muppet Show."

References

External links

2002 compilation albums
2002 soundtrack albums
Television soundtracks
Rhino Records compilation albums
Rhino Records soundtracks
Soundtrack compilation albums
The Muppets albums
2000s comedy albums